Jingan (formerly transliterated as Ching-An Station until 2003) is a metro station in New Taipei, Taiwan, served by Taipei Metro. The elevated  platforms opened on 31 January 2020.

Station overview
This six-level, underground station has two stacked side platforms (a split platform configuration,) two side platforms and one exit. Jingan station is also the only transfer station in the Taipei Metro to have only one exit. The platforms planned intersection with include additional.

Due to the availability of the station area, when the Zhonghe line platform was being constructed, it adapted a stacked side platform configuration, making the platform level reach to six levels underground, making it one of the deepest stations in the metro system. The elevated Circular line, on the other hand, is one of the highest stations in the metro system with the platform level located five floors above ground, due to the Circular line needing to share the same path as Provincial Highway 64 on some parts of the line. Transferring from the Zhonghe-Xinlu line to the Circular line or vice versa takes about 5 minutes, with the height difference between the two platforms reaching 10 levels, the largest height difference of all transfer stations in the Taipei Metro.

Station layout

Exits
Single Exit: Jingan Rd.

Around the station
Jinshan Bannan Park (250m south of the station)
Zhonghe Heping Street Market (250m southeast of the station)

References

Railway stations opened in 1998
Zhonghe–Xinlu line stations
Zhonghe District
Circular line stations (Taipei Metro)